Seret or Sereter Hasidim were a group of Hasidic Jews that existed in the town of Siret (Seret) and the surrounding area in Bukovina (currently split between Romania and Ukraine) during the late nineteenth century until World War II.

They were headed by their Rebbe ("Grand Rabbi") whose family name was Rubin and was a scion of the Hasidic dynasties of the Kosov, Ropshitz and Belz. In practice the Seret Hasidic group was a branch of the Kosov dynasty.

History
The best known Rebbe of Kosov (forerunner of the Vizhnitz Dynasty), Rabbi Chaim Hager died in 1854 in Kosov (at that time in East Galicia in Eastern Europe) and left three sons, each of whom had a great number of followers (Hasidim).

The followers of the Hager family, whose numbers in Bukovina were great and who were important, tried to persuade one of the brothers, the second oldest, Rabbi Yosef Alter Hager, to move his permanent residence to Radovitz (Radauti). They wanted thereby to increase the number of visitors to the town, because the followers of the rabbi were accustomed to come from near and far for all holidays and even at other times to make pilgrimages to him.

They were successful, and in 1856 he was received in Radovitz with great ceremony by the whole population.

Reb Yosef Alter was married to Leah, the granddaughter of Reb Moshe Tzvi of Savran.

Reb Yosef Alter did a lot to stimulate the Jewish community and he worked hand in hand with the community's Rabbi Schapira to increase the spirituality of the well-to-do. It is true that he sometimes had conflicts regarding the observance of the Sabbath, because as market day was Friday, some of them continued to work after the beginning of the Sabbath–something on Friday eve, that had much upset his father, Rabbi Chaim Hager, too.

Matters went so far that the rabbi temporarily moved his seat to Seret in protest at the defilement. His followers tried to get the culprits to reform in order to persuade the rabbi to return to Radovitz and their efforts were crowned with success. The rabbi came back.

All in all his stay in Radovitz was of considerable significance. The whole town, young and old, held him in great esteem and treated him with great respect for the whole of his twenty-year presence here.

Whenever something good happened in the rabbi's family everyone rejoiced with him. On Saturdays and holidays the local population would join in prayers with Hasidim who had traveled here, and also partake of the rabbi's meals.

In the year 1873 Reb Yosef Alter decided to emigrate to the Land of Israel in order to spend the last years of his life there. The pleas of his numerous friends and followers to give up this plan were to no avail. The rabbi stuck by his decision. But he did at least offer to leave his only son, Rabbi Moshe Hager in his place in Radovitz.

The departure of the old Rabbi turned into a great procession. An unbroken row of wagons extended from his home six kilometers to the train station in Hadikfalva. Many thousands of local and foreign Hasidim were very reluctant to say a final goodbye to their beloved Rabbi.

After his departure, his only son, Rabbi Moshe Hager, took over his seat in Radovitz, while his elder son in law Rabbi Shmuel Schmelke Rubin (1840-1901), who was married to his daughter Chaya, began to lead a large group of Hasidim in nearby Seret (Siret).

Rabbi Schmelke's parents were Rabbi Yitzchok Rubin of Brody (Brod), the grandson of Rabbi Naftali Tzvi of Ropczyce (Ropschitz) and Eidel, who was the daughter of Rabbi Sholom Rokeach of Belz.

As Reb Schmelke began leading his following in Seret, his name became renowned throughout Bukovina as a wondrous miracle worker and brilliant leader. In time, his followers increased and opened up "Sereter" synagogues in many towns of Bukovina such as; Gura Homuruliu, Suceava and Radovitz.

After Rabbi Schmelke's passing in 1901 the following shrank significantly. He was succeeded as Rebbe by his son Rabbi Pinchos Menachem Mendel Rubin (1870-1941). Rabbi Schmelke's son in law Rabbi Chaim Dachner served as the head of the rabbinic court in Siret.

Rabbi Mendel's eldest son was Rabbi Moses Josef Rubin of Câmpulung Moldovenesc (1892-1980) who was a prominent rabbi in pre-World War II Romania and post-war New York City. The renowned Halchachic authority Rabbi Meshulam Roth of Cernăuţi (1875-1962) was a son in law of Rabbi Mendel.

Rabbi Boruch Hager of the Vizhnitz Hasidic dynasty served as the official town rabbi in Seret during the years 1936-1941. After World War II he moved to Israel where he established a neighborhood called "Ramat Vizhnitz" in Haifa and became known as the Seret-Vizhnitzer Rebbe. After his death he was succeeded by his son Rabbi Eliezer Hager. Who was then succeeded by his son the current seret-vishnitz rebba, and his son inlaw rabbi naftali reuven kornreich , kosov vishnitz rebba of beis shemesh.

Virtually all members of the original Seret community perished in the Transnistria concentration camps (see Romania during World War II).

Legacy

This dynasty ceased to exist during World War II. There are, however, several Hasidic dynasties that descend from the Seret dynasty, including the Muzhai, Sulitza, Sasregen, and Ropshitz groups (see Ropshitz (Hasidic dynasty))—all currently based in New York.

See also
History of the Jews in Romania

External links
Muzhayer Rebbe, a scion of the Seret dynasty, lighting Hanukah Menorah
Muzhayer Rebbe speaking after kindling Hanukah menorah

References

Bukovina
Hasidic dynasties
Hasidic Judaism in Israel
Hasidic Judaism in the United States
Hasidic Judaism in Romania
Hasidic  Judaism in Ukraine